Fighting 2 Quarters and a Nickel is a live performance album by Rake., released in 1998 through VHF Records. The front cover photograph and design is a direct reference to the 1978 album Heavy Organ by organist Virgil Fox.

Track listing

Personnel 
Adapted from the Fighting 2 Quarters and a Nickel liner notes.
Rake.
Jim Ayre – electric guitar, vocals
Bill Kellum – bass guitar
Carl Moller – drums, saxophone

Release history

References

External links 
 Fighting 2 Quarters and a Nickel at Discogs (list of releases)

1998 live albums
Rake (band) albums
VHF Records live albums